"Tracks" is a 2003 animated short film by Corrie Francis Parks. The film is created with sand animation on a colored background, making it unique in the genre of sand animation films. The film features music from the group Iguewa Ni Mbia from Cameroon and is an impressionistic journey through the African savannah. The film has been shown at the Hiroshima International Animation Festival, Anima Mundi, Melbourne International Animation Festival and Tehran International Animation Festival

References
Corrie Francis Parks studied animation at University of Southern California and is a freelance artist.

External links
 
 Watch Tracks at AVNtv.com

2003 films
American animated short films
Sand animated films
2003 animated films
2003 short films
2000s stop-motion animated films
2000s American films